African Communist is the magazine of the South African Communist Party, published quarterly. The magazine was started by a group of Marxist-Leninists in 1959. It has its headquarters in Johannesburg.

References

External links
 "African Communist", SACP.

1959 establishments in South Africa
Communism in South Africa
Communist magazines
English-language magazines published in South Africa
Magazines established in 1959
Marxist magazines
Mass media in Johannesburg
South African Communist Party
Political magazines published in South Africa
Quarterly magazines